Chuikhim is a village located towards the south of Kalimpong Hills in West Bengal in India It is located at the elevation of 3500 feet above sea level. Every November, the village hosts Indradhanush Chuikhim Earth Festival. Support Himalayan Agro Rural Enterprise (SHARE) operates community based tourism system in Chuikhim where tourists stay at the home of villagers.

References 

Villages in Kalimpong district
Hill stations in West Bengal